The 1968 Wake Forest Demon Deacons football team was an American football team that represented Wake Forest University during the 1968 NCAA University Division football season. In their fifth season under head coach Bill Tate, the Demon Deacons compiled a 2-7-1 record and finished in sixth place in the Atlantic Coast Conference.

Schedule

Team leaders

References

Wake Forest
Wake Forest Demon Deacons football seasons
Wake Forest Demon Deacons football